John Loder (born William John Muir Lowe; 3 January 1898 – 26 December 1988) was established as a British film actor in Germany and Britain before migrating to the United States in 1928 for work in the new talkies. He worked in Hollywood for two periods, becoming an American citizen in 1947. After living also in Argentina, he became a naturalized British citizen in 1959.

Biography

Early life
Loder was born in 1898 in Knightsbridge, London. His father was W. H. M. Lowe, a British career army officer who achieved the rank of general. Patrick Pearse, the leader of the 1916 Easter Rising in Dublin, Ireland, surrendered to him. Both were present at the surrender. His mother was Frances Broster Johnson (née de Salvo; 1857–1942), daughter of Francesco de Salvo of Palermo, Sicily and his English wife Emma Broster. Frances was widowed when she married Lowe; she had been married to the late Captain Robert Harry Johnson of the 64th Foot Regiment. Loder had a younger sister, Elizabeth (born in 1900), who would later become a nun. He had also three older half-siblings from his mother's first marriage: Harry Cecil Johnson (1877–1915), Dorothy Johnson (1880–1971) and Gladys Frances McGrath (née Johnson; formerly Kingsmill; 1881-?).

Loder was educated at Eton and the Royal Military College, Sandhurst, Berkshire.

World War One
Loder followed his father into the army, being commissioned into 15th Hussars as a second lieutenant on 17 March 1915, during the First World War. He was immediately sent to Gallipoli, where he served until the British withdrawal.

From 21 April until early May 1916, Loder was stationed in Ireland, serving as his father's ADC, and where they both witnessed the surrender of the leaders of the Easter Rising.

He rejoined his regiment in Rouen, France, in May 1916, and was engaged in the 1916 Battle of the Somme.

He was taken prisoner by the Germans on 21 March 1918 at the village of Roisel and transported to Le Cateau gaol and then by train to the first of several prisoner-of-war camps, Rastatt, in Baden, Germany.

Upon being released, Loder stayed in Germany where he was assigned military duties on behalf of the Inter-Allied Commission in Breslau and Upper Silesia.

Germany
Leaving the cavalry, Loder went into business with a German friend, Walter Becker, establishing a pickle factory in Potsdam. Later he began to develop an interest in acting. He appeared at the British Theatre Guild in Berlin and enjoyed success in productions of The Last of Mrs Cheyney, which had opened in London in 1925, and Loyalties.

He began appearing in bit parts in a few German films produced at the Tempelhof Film Studios including Dancing Mad (1925). He had a good part in Madame Wants No Children (1926), directed by Alexander Korda before going on to appear in numerous films in the next two  years: The Last Waltz, The White Spider, The Great Unknown, all in 1927; and Alraune, Fair Game, When the Mother and the Daughter, Casanova's Legacy, The Sinner, and Adam and Eve, all released in 1928.

British films
Loder left Germany to return briefly to the United Kingdom. He had a support role in The First Born (1928), playing Madeleine Carroll's love interest.

First period in Hollywood
Loder was signed by Paramount Studios. He appeared in The Case of Lena Smith (1929) directed by European Josef Von Sternberg. He made The Doctor's Secret (1929), Paramount's first talking picture, playing Ruth Chatterton's leading man. He appeared opposite Jack Holt in a Western, Sunset Pass (1929). But his very English persona in these roles did not win over viewers in the United States.

He also appeared in Black Waters (1929), the first British talkie, which was made in the US by producer Herbert Wilcox, and The Unholy Night (1929) at MGM. Loder made some for Pathe: Her Private Affair (1929), The Racketeer (1929), and Rich People (1930).

Alexander Korda had also moved to Hollywood and cast Loder in Lilies of the Field (1930). This was produced by Warners Studio, who also used Loder in The Second Floor Mystery (1930), Sweethearts and Wives (1930), The Man Hunter (1931) (a Rin Tin Tin film), and One Night at Susie's (1931). He went to Fox Studio for Seas Beneath (1931) directed by John Ford. That year he also appeared in a film for Hal Roach at MGM, On the Loose (1931).

Return to Britain
Loder returned to Britain. He starred in a comedy for Herbert Wilcox, Money Means Nothing (1932), and was reunited with Korda in Wedding Rehearsal (1933).

Loder pursued Merle Oberon in The Battle (1933) and had the star role in Money for Speed (1933) opposite Ida Lupino. He was in You Made Me Love You (1933), and that year had a small part in Korda's hugely successful The Private Life of Henry VIII (1933), playing the love interest of Elsa Lanchester's Anne of Cleeves.

Loder had lead roles in low-budget, quota quickies such as Paris Plane (1933) and Rolling in Money (1934) as well as the romantic male lead in the Gracie Fields vehicle, Love, Life and Laughter (1934).

Loder specialised in leading man parts in Warn London (1934); Java Head (1934) with Anna May Wong; Sing As We Go (1934) with Fields again, and a big hit; My Song Goes Round the World (1934); Lorna Doone (1934), as John Ridd; and 18 Minutes (1935).

He was top billed in The Silent Passenger (1935) and It Happened in Paris (1935) and supported in the Mozart biopic, Whom the Gods Love (1936). Loder was reunited with Gracie Fields in Queen of Hearts (1936) and starred in an IRA drama, Ourselves Alone (1936). He had a part in Guilty Melody (1936) and supported Boris Karloff in The Man Who Changed His Mind (1936).

Loder played the heroic investigator in Alfred Hitchcock's Sabotage (1936), replacing Robert Donat before taking on the role of Sir Henry Curtis, the male romantic interest in the 1937 original film version of King Solomon's Mines, romancing Anna Lee.

He romanced Margaret Lockwood in Doctor Syn (1937), supporting George Arliss. He and Lee were reunited in Non-Stop New York (1937), and he took on Erich von Stroheim in Under Secret Orders (1937).

Loder and Lockwood romanced again in support of a crusty old actor in Owd Bob (1938), before he went to France to appear in Katia (1938) with Danielle Darrieux, in which he played Alexander II of Russia.

He returned to Britain and starred in thrillers Anything to Declare? (1939), The Silent Battle (1939) with Rex Harrison, and Murder Will Out (1939). He had the title role in Meet Maxwell Archer (1940).

Return to Hollywood
After Britain entered the Second World War, Loder returned to the United States. He coasted into a career in B movie roles, usually playing upper-crust characters. He also played one role onstage on Broadway, in 1947's For Love or Money opposite June Lockhart.

He was in Adventure in Diamonds (1940) and Diamond Frontier (1940). At 20th Century Fox he made Tin Pan Alley (1940), Scotland Yard (1941), and How Green Was My Valley (1941), in which he played a brother of Roddy McDowall's character.

He also worked in such war films as Confirm or Deny (1941), One Night in Lisbon (1941), and Eagle Squadron (1941).

Warner Bros.
In Now, Voyager (1942), he played a wealthy widower engaged to Bette Davis's character. That was made by Warners who used Loder in Gentleman Jim (1942) as Errol Flynn's love rival. Warners gave him a then-rare lead in a B, The Gorilla Man (1943), The Mysterious Doctor (1943), Murder on the Waterfront (1943), and Adventure in Iraq (1943).

He was back with Davis in Old Acquaintance (1943) and supported Humphrey Bogart in Passage to Marseille (1944).

In the early 1940s, Loder was host of Silver Theater, a dramatic anthology on CBS radio. He also starred in the programme's 11 June 1944 episode.

Freelance
Loder freelanced as an actor. He had support roles in The Hairy Ape (1944), and Abroad with Two Yanks (1944), then had a lead part in some B films: The Brighton Strangler (1945), Jealousy (1945), A Game of Death (1945) (a remake of The Most Dangerous Game), and The Wife of Monte Cristo (1946).

He supported in an A film, One More Tomorrow (1946) and appeared opposite then-wife Hedy Lamarr in Dishonored Lady (1947). Loder then appeared in a minor Broadway hit in For Love or Money (1947–48). Around this time he began to focus increasingly on business as opposed to acting.

Later career
Loder's later film appearances included British films The Story of Esther Costello (1957), Small Hotel (1957), and Gideon's Day (1958). His last film was The Firechasers (1971).

Personal life, marriages and children
He was unmarried when he fathered his first son. The boy followed his father to Eton and served in the Grenadier Guards. He later became a theatrical and literary agent, and was married three times. His last marriage was to British actress Hilary Tindall (1938–1992). She played Ann Hammond in the 1970s BBC TV series The Brothers.

In 1932 Loder was named in the divorce proceedings of Wanda Holden and Charles Baillie-Hamilton, a former MP.

Loder was married five times; two of his wives were actresses. 

He first married French star Micheline Cheirel (married 1936–41 – they had one daughter together, who later married Paul Meurisse).
Secondly, he wed Austrian-American actress Hedy Lamarr in the United States (married 1943–47). He and Lamarr had three children together: James Markey Loder (born 1939), when Lamarr was married to Gene Markey; they adopted this boy and she said he was unrelated; Loder adopted him after their marriage; Denise (born 1945) and Anthony Loder (born 1947). Documentation found after Lamarr's death was reported in 2001 to reveal that James was born to Lamarr and Loder before their marriage.

Loder's other wives were Sophie Kabel, Evelyn Auff Mordt, and finally, in 1958, the heiress Alba Julia Lagomarsino of Argentina. After their marriage, he lived on her 25,000-acre cattle ranch and spent much time at the Jockey Club in Buenos Aires.

After they divorced in 1972, Loder returned to London. He resided for some years in a house opposite Harrods department store.

In 1947, Loder had become an American citizen. In 1959, he became a naturalised citizen of the United Kingdom. Given his varied residencies, he had been considered of "uncertain nationality" by that time.

Later years
He published his autobiography, Hollywood Hussar, in 1977. Loder's general health deteriorated in his eighties, and he was admitted in 1982 to the Distressed Gentlefolks Aid Association's Nursing Home in Vicarage Gate, Kensington. He went weekly by taxi to his London club, 'Bucks', in Mayfair, for luncheon. He died in London, aged 90, in 1988.

In popular culture 
Loder is the focus of the play The Private View: Fairytales of Ireland 1916–2016, written by Trevor White and directed by Gerard Stembridge. The play was staged by The Little Museum of Dublin as part of the Dublin Theatre Festival in October 2015, and was performed at the American Irish Historical Society in November of the same year.

Filmography

 Dancing Mad (1925) as Dance extra (uncredited)
 Madame Wants No Children (1926) as Dancer (uncredited)
 The Last Waltz (1927)
 The White Spider (1927) as Lord Gray
 The Great Unknown (1927) as Dr. Ralf Hallam
 Alraune (1928) as Der Vicomte
 Fair Game (1928) as Oberleutnant von Rohnstedt
 When the Mother and the Daughter (1928)
 Casanova's Legacy (1928)
 The Sinner (1928) as Armand
 The First Born (1928) as Lord David Harborough
 Adam and Eve (1928)
 The Case of Lena Smith (1929) (uncredited)
 The Doctor's Secret (1929) as Hugh Paton
 Sunset Pass (1929) as Ashleigh Preston
 Black Waters (1929) as Charles
 The Unholy Night (1929) as Capt. Dorchester
 Her Private Affair (1929) as Carl 
 Love, Live and Laugh (1929) as Dr. Price
 The Racketeer (1929) as Jack Oakhurst
 Rich People (1929) as Captain Danforth
 Lilies of the Field (1930) as Walter Harker
 The Second Floor Mystery (1930) as Fraser-Freer's Younger Brother
 The Man Hunter (1930) as George Castle
 Sweethearts and Wives (1930) as Sam Worthington
 One Night at Susie's (1930) as Hayes
 Are You There? (1930) as Bit Role (uncredited)
 Seas Beneath (1931) as Franz Shiller
 On the Loose (1931, short) as Mr. Loder
 Money Means Nothing (1932) as Earl Egbert
 Wedding Rehearsal (1932) as John Hopkins aka Bimbo
 La bataille (1933) as Herbert Fergan
 Money for Speed (1933) as Mitch
 You Made Me Love You (1933) as Harry Berne
 The Private Life of Henry VIII (1933) as Peynell
 Paris Plane (1933)
 Rolling in Money (1934) as Lord Gawthorpe
 Love, Life and Laughter (1934) as Prince Charles
 Thunder in the East (1934) as Fergan
 Warn London (1934) as Inspector Yorke / Barraclough
 Java Head (1934) as Gerrit Ammidon
 Sing As We Go (1934) as Hugh Phillips
 My Song Goes Round the World (1934) as Rico
 Lorna Doone (1934) as John Ridd
 18 Minutes (1935) as Trelawney
 The Silent Passenger (1935) as John Ryder
 It Happened in Paris (1935) as Paul
 Whom the Gods Love (1936) as Prince Lobkowitz
 Queen of Hearts (1936) as Derek Cooper
 Ourselves Alone (1936) as Captain Wiltshire
 Guilty Melody (1936) as Richard Carter
 The Man Who Changed His Mind (1936) as Dick Haslewood
 Sabotage (1936) as Sergeant Ted Spencer
 King Solomon's Mines (1937) as Sir Henry Curtis
 Doctor Syn (1937) as Denis Cobtree
 Non-Stop New York (1937) as Inspector Jim Grant
 Under Secret Orders (1937) as Lt. Peter Carr
 Owd Bob (1938) as David Moore
 Katia (1938) as Le tsar Alexandre II
  (1938) as Émile Scheffer
 Anything to Declare? (1938) as Capt. Rufus Grant
 The Silent Battle (1939) as Bordier
 Murder Will Out (1939) as Dr. Paul Raymond
 Threats (1940) as Dick Stone
 Meet Maxwell Archer (1940) as Maxwell Archer
 Adventure in Diamonds (1940) as Michael Barclay
 Diamond Frontier (1940) as Dr. Charles Clayton
 Tin Pan Alley (1940) as Reggie Carstair
 Scotland Yard (1941) as Sir John Lasher
 One Night in Lisbon (1941) as Cmdr. Peter Walmsley
 How Green Was My Valley (1941) as Ianto
 Confirm or Deny (1941) as Captain Lionel Channing
 Eagle Squadron (1942) as Paddy Carson
 Now, Voyager (1942) as Elliot Livingston
 Gentleman Jim (1942) as Carlton De Witt
 The Gorilla Man (1943) as Captain Craig Killian
 The Mysterious Doctor (1943) as Sir Henry Leland
 Murder on the Waterfront (1943) as Lt. Cmdr. Holbrook
 Adventure in Iraq (1943) as George Torrence
 Old Acquaintance (1943) as Preston Drake
 Passage to Marseille (1944) as Manning
 The Hairy Ape (1944) as Tony Lazar
 Abroad with Two Yanks (1944) as Aussie Sgt. Cyril North
 The Brighton Strangler (1945) as Reginald Parker / Edward Grey
 Jealousy (1945) as Dr. David Brent
 A Game of Death (1945) as Don Rainsford
 Woman Who Came Back (1945) as Dr. Matt Adams
 The Fighting Guardsman (1946) as Sir John Tanley
 The Wife of Monte Cristo (1946) as De Villefort, Prefect of Police
 One More Tomorrow (1946) as Owen Arthur
 Dishonored Lady (1947) as Felix Courtland
 The Story of Esther Costello (1957) as Paul Marchant
 Small Hotel (1957) as Mr. Finch
 Woman and the Hunter (1957) as Mitchell Gifford
 Gideon's Day (1958) as The Duke
 The Secret Man (1958) as Maj. Anderson
 Allá donde el viento brama (1963) 
 The Firechasers (1971) as Routledge (final film role)

References

External links

 
 John Loder at Virtual History
 
 1977 interview for the British Forces Broadcasting Service
 

1898 births
1988 deaths
People educated at Eton College
American male film actors
American male stage actors
American male silent film actors
English male film actors
English male silent film actors
English male stage actors
15th The King's Hussars officers
British Army personnel of World War I
Male actors from London
Graduates of the Royal Military College, Sandhurst
British emigrants to the United States
20th-century American male actors
20th-century English male actors
British World War I prisoners of war
World War I prisoners of war held by Germany